The Kenya national under-20 football team represents Kenya in football at this age level and is controlled by the Football Kenya Federation. The team competes in the African U-20 Championship, held every two years.

Honours
CECAFA U-20 Championship:
Winners (2): 1975, 1999
Runners-up (2): 1973, 2019

African national under-20 association football teams
under-20
Football in Kenya
Youth in Kenya